Renata Kasalová (born 5 March 1969) is a Slovak table tennis player. She competed in the women's singles event at the 1988 Summer Olympics.

References

1969 births
Living people
Slovak female table tennis players
Olympic table tennis players of Czechoslovakia
Table tennis players at the 1988 Summer Olympics
People from Bánovce nad Bebravou
Sportspeople from the Trenčín Region